AGP may refer to:

Science and technology
 Accelerated Graphics Port, a high-speed point-to-point channel for attaching a graphics card to a computer's motherboard
 Advance Game Port, a third-party GameCube accessory
 Aerosol-generating procedure, in medicine or healthcare
 Ambulatory glucose profile, a standardized report for interpreting a person's daily glucose and insulin patterns
 Arabinogalactan protein, glycoproteins found in the cell walls of plants
 Orosomucoid, or alpha-1 acid glycoprotein

Organisations
 Arasan Ganesan Polytechnic, India
 Asom Gana Parishad, a political party of Assam
 Associação Guias de Portugal, the national Guiding association of Portugal
 Guinean Press Agency (French: Agence Guinéenne de Presse)

People
 Charles Marvin Green Jr., better known as Angry Grandpa (1950–2017), American Internet personality
 Alejandro García Padilla (born 1971), Puerto Rican politician
 A. George Pradel (c. 1938), mayor of Naperville, Illinois
 Arthur Guyon Purchas (1821-1906), Welsh-New Zealander clergyman

Other uses
 Acordo Geral de Paz (Rome General Peace Accords), ending Mozambique's civil war in 1992
 Australian Grand Prix, a motor race 
 Autogynephilia, a disputed psychological typology of transfeminine people.
 Málaga Airport (IATA code), Spain
 Motor torpedo boat tender, US Navy hull classification system
 Artificial grass pitch, a sports pitch made from synthetic materials